Debt Ratio is a financial ratio that indicates the percentage of a company's assets that are provided via debt. It is the ratio of total debt (short-term and long-term liabilities) and total assets (the sum of current assets, fixed assets, and other assets such as 'goodwill').

 

or alternatively:

 

Total liabilities divided by total assets or the debt/asset ratio shows the proportion of a company's assets which are financed through debt. If the ratio is less than 0.5, most of the company's assets are financed through equity. If the ratio is greater than 0.5, most of the company's assets are financed through debt. Companies with high debt/asset ratios are said to be highly leveraged. The higher the ratio, the greater risk will be associated with the firm's operation. In addition, high debt to assets ratio may indicate low borrowing capacity of a firm, which in turn will lower the firm's financial flexibility. Like all financial ratios, a company's debt ratio should be compared with their industry average or other competing firms.

See also
Equity ratio
Debt-to-income ratio, for households
Debt-to-GDP ratio, for governments

References

Corporate Finance: European Edition, by D. Hillier, S. Ross, R. Westerfield, J. Jaffe, and B. Jordan. McGraw-Hill, 1st Edition, 2010.

Financial ratios